{{Infobox officeholder
| name                = Alois Bachschmid
| image               = 
| imagesize           = 
| smallimage          =
| caption             = 
| office              = Gauleiter of Gau Elbe-Havel
| term_start          = 25 November 1925
| term_end            = 1 September 1926
| predecessor         = Position created
| successor           = Position abolished
| birth_name          = Alois Anton Michael Bachschmid
| birth_date          = 13 June 1900
| birth_place         = Augsburg, Bavaria, German Empire
| death_date          = 21 August 1968
| death_place         = Bolzano, Italy
| nationality         = German
| occupation          = Salesman
| party               =  Nazi Party (NSDAP)
| otherparty          = Greater German People's Community
 
 | nickname        = 
 | allegiance      = 
 | branch          = Imperial German Army
 | serviceyears    = 1918-1919
 | rank            = 
 | unit            = 
 | commands        = 
 | battles         = World War I
 | mawards         =
 | footnotes       = 
}}
Alois Bachschmid, often mistakenly spelled Bachschmidt (13 June 1900 in Augsburg – 21 August 1968 in Bolzano), was a German politician and early member of the Nazi Party (NSDAP) who served as the Gauleiter of Gau Elbe-Havel.

Life and career
From June to November 1918 Bachschmid served in a Royal Bavarian infantry regiment in the last months of the First World War. Discharged from the military in January 1919, he worked as a salesman and business manager. Drawn to nationalist, conservative politics, he was an early adherent of the Nazi Party in Swabia.
 
In the aftermath of the Beer Hall Putsch of November 1923, the Party officially was banned by the Weimar Republic. Bachschmid then joined the Greater German People's Community (Großdeutsche Volksgemeinschaft, GVG), a Nazi front organization set up in January 1924 by Alfred Rosenberg, on instructions from Adolf Hitler who was incarcerated in Landsberg prison. Bachschmid served as a member of the GVG executive committee. Other prominent Nazis who were GVG members included Max Amann, Hermann Esser and Julius Streicher.

In early 1925, Bachschmid served on a committee laying the groundwork for establishing an Ortsgruppe (Local Group) in Augsburg when the ban on the Party was eventually lifted. The Nazi Party was officially re-established on 27 February 1925. Bachschmid joined it on 1 April 1925 and received the low membership number 76.

On 25 November 1925, Bachschmid was appointed Gauleiter of Gau Elbe-Havel in central Germany, with headquarters first in Magdeburg, and later in Brandenburg an der Havel. In this capacity he served as the regional Party leader, reporting directly to Hitler and serving as his representative in the Gau. He remained in this position until 1 September 1926 when, on Hitler’s order, the Gau was dissolved and merged with Gau Anhalt and Gau Magdeburg to form Gau Anhalt-North Saxony Province, under the leadership of Gustav Hermann Schmischke who had headed Gau Anhalt. On 26 October 1926, as a member of Ortsgruppe'' Magdeburg, Bachschmid resigned from the Party for unknown reasons. After more than ten years of non-membership, he was allowed to rejoin it on 1 May 1937 and was assigned as a Gau public welfare administrator. No additional details about his life are known.

Reference

Weblink 
Grossdeutsche Volksgemeinschaft in Bavarian Historical Lexicon retrieved 19 February 2021.

Sources

1900 births
1968 deaths
Gauleiters
German Army personnel of World War I
Greater German People's Community politicians
Nazi Party officials
Politicians from Augsburg